This list of fictional snakes is  subsidiary to the list of fictional animals and is a collection of various notable serpentine characters that appear in various works of fiction. It is limited to well-referenced examples of snakes in literature, music, film, television, comics, animation and video games.

Literature

Music

Comics

Animation

Television

Video games

See also
Legendary Serpents

References

Snakes
 
Fictional